The Heart of Casanova (German: Das Herz des Casanova) is a 1919 German silent film directed by Erik Lund.

The film's art direction was by Siegfried Wroblewsky.

Cast
 Ria Jende 
 Bruno Kastner 
 Rose Lichtenstein 
 Karl Platen

References

Bibliography
 Hans-Michael Bock and Tim Bergfelder. The Concise Cinegraph: An Encyclopedia of German Cinema. Berghahn Books.

External links

1919 films
Films of the Weimar Republic
German silent feature films
Films directed by Erik Lund
German black-and-white films
1910s German films